Chamran Grand Hotel of Shiraz is a five star hotel located in Chamran Boulevard surrounded by the Ghasrodasht gardens in Shiraz, Iran. The structure has a height of 109 meters, and is the highest hotel tower in Iran. The hotel has 230 rooms and 20 suites. Construction of the hotel began in 2008 and it was officially opened in April 2011.

See also
 List of tallest structures in Iran

References 

Hotel buildings completed in 2011
Hotels in Iran
Buildings and structures in Shiraz